Football Club Goa, also known as Goa, is a professional football club based in Goa, India, that competes in the Indian Super League. The club was officially launched on 26 August 2014.

Honours

League 
Indian Super League
Premiers: 2019–20
Runners-up: 2015, 2018–19

Cups 
Super Cup
Winners: 2019
Durand Cup
Winners: 2021

Regional 
Goa Professional League
Winners: 2018–19

Goa Police Cup
Winners: 2019

GFA Charity Cup
Winners: 2019

Club

All time performance record 

As of 3 June 2022

ISL seasons record

General 
Note: When scores are mentioned, score of FC Goa are given first.

First match: 1-2 (vs Chennaiyin FC, 15 October 2014)
First win: 2-1 (vs Delhi Dynamos, 1 November 2014)
Biggest win : 7-0 (vs Mumbai City FC, 17 November 2015) (also an ISL record)
Biggest away win : 
5-0 (vs Jamshedpur FC, 19 February 2020) (also an ISL record)
5-0 (vs Jamshedpur FC, 17 September 2021) (Durand Cup)
Biggest loss:
0-4 (vs Chennaiyin FC, 11 October 2015)
0-4 (vs ATK, 22 November 2015)
1-5 (vs Delhi Dynamos, 27 November 2016)
0-4 (vs Persepolis FC, 23 April 2021)
Highest scoring draw:
3-3 (vs Mumbai City FC, 8 February 2021)
Longest winning run: 5 games, during 2019-20 Indian Super League season
Longest unbeaten run: 17 (15+2) games, during 2020-21 Indian Super League season (also an ISL record) and 2021 AFC Champions League
Biggest win in Super Cup: 5-1 (vs Jamshedpur FC,  12 April 2018) (also a Super Cup record)
Biggest loss in Super Cup: 0-1 (vs SC East Bengal,  16 April 2018)
Biggest win in Champions League: N/A
Biggest loss in Champions League: 0-4 (vs Persepolis FC, 23 April 2021)
Highest home attendance: 19752 (vs Kerala Blasters FC, 26 November 2014)
Lowest home attendance: 2567 (vs Delhi Dynamos, 21 February 2018)
Highest average home attendance in a season: 18843, during 2015 Indian Super League season
Lowest average home attendance in a season: 13532, during 2019-20 Indian Super League season
Note: The stats given below doesn't include the data from the playoffs.
Most wins in a ISL season: 12 (out of 18 matches), during 2019-20 Indian Super League season
Fewest wins in a ISL season: 4 (out of 14 matches), during 2016 Indian Super League season
Most defeats in a ISL season: 8 (out of 14 matches), during 2016 Indian Super League season
Fewest defeats in a ISL season: 3
(out of 14 matches), during 2015 Indian Super League season
(out of 18 matches), during 2019-20 Indian Super League season
(out of 20 matches), during 2020-21 Indian Super League season
Most draws in a ISL season: 10 (out of 20 matches), during 2020-21 Indian Super League season
Fewest draws in a ISL season: 2 (out of 14 matches), during 2016 Indian Super League season
Most goals scored in a ISL season: 46 in 18 games, during 2019-20 Indian Super League season (also an ISL record)
Fewest goals scored in a ISL season: 15 in 14 games, during 2016 Indian Super League season
Most goals conceded in a ISL season: 28 in 18 games, during 2017-18 Indian Super League season
Fewest goals conceded in a ISL season: 12 in 14 games, during 2014 Indian Super League season
Most clean sheets in a season: 8 in 18 games, during 2018-19 Indian Super League season
Fewest clean sheets in a season: 2 in 18 games, during 2017-18 Indian Super League season
Most points in a ISL season: 39 in 18 games, during 2019-20 Indian Super League season
Fewest points in a ISL season: 14 in 14 games, during 2016 Indian Super League season
Best ISL league stage finish: 1st – 2015 & 2019-20
Worst ISL league stage finish: 8th – 2016
Best goal difference in a season: +23, during 2019-20 Indian Super League season (also an ISL record)
Worst goal difference in a season: -10, during 2016 Indian Super League season

Players

Appearances 
Record appearance maker: 100 – Mandar Rao Dessai
Most appearances in Indian Super League: 97 – Mandar Rao Dessai (also an ISL record)
Most ISL finals appearance: 2 – Mandar Rao Dessai
Most appearances in Super Cup: 7 –
Ferran Corominas
Seriton Fernandes
Most appearances in AFC Champions League: 6 –
Brandon Fernandes
Glan Martins
Ishan Pandita
Sanson Pereira
Youngest player: Mohammad Nawaz – 18 years, 8 months and 10 days (on 1 October 2018 vs NorthEast United FC)
Youngest foreign player: Matheus Trindade – 20 years, 6 months and 29 days (on 4 October 2016 vs NorthEast United FC)
Oldest player: Robert Pires – 41 years, 1month and 11 days (on 10 December 2014 vs ATK)
Oldest Indian player: Lenny Rodrigues – 33 years, 8 months and 7 days (on 17 January 2021 vs ATK Mohun Bagan FC)

Most appearances 
As of 8 December 2021
(Players with their names in bold currently plays for the club.)

1 Other appearances include: Durand Cup

Club captains 
Most appearances as a captain in ISL: 39 – Mandar Rao Dessai

List of Club Captains

Goals 
All time top scorer: 55 – Ferran Corominas
All time Indian top scorer: 11 – Brandon Fernandes
First goalscorer: Grégory Arnolin (vs Chennaiyin FC, 15 October 2014)
First Indian goalscorer: Jewel Raja (vs Delhi Dynamos, 1 November 2014)
First Goan goalscorer: Romeo Fernandes (vs FC Pune City, 22 November 2014)
First goal at home ground: Grégory Arnolin (vs Chennaiyin FC, 15 October 2015)
Most goals in ISL: 48 – Ferran Corominas (also an ISL record) 
Most goals in ISL by an Indian : 9 – Jackichand Singh
Most goals in an ISL season: 18 – Ferran Corominas, during 2017-18 Indian Super League season (also an ISL record)
Most goals in a ISL season by an Indian: 5 – Jackichand Singh, during 2019-20 Indian Super League season
First goalscorer in Champions League: Edu Bedia (vs Persepolis, 20 April 2021)
First Indian goalscorer in Champions League: N/A
Most goals in AFC Champions League: 1
Edu Bedia
Jorge Ortiz
First goalscorer in Super Cup: Ferran Corominas (vs ATK, 3 April 2018)
First Indian goalscorer in Super Cup: Brandon Fernandes (vs ATK, 3 April 2018)
Most goals in Super Cup: 7 – Ferran Corominas (also a joint Super Cup record with Sunil Chettri)
Most goals in a Super Cup: 5 – Ferran Corominas during 2019 Indian Super Cup
Most goals in a match: 3
Dudu Omagbemi (vs Mumbai, 17 November 2015)
Thongkhosiem Haokip (vs Mumbai, 17 November 2015)
Reinaldo (vs Kerala, 29 November 2015)
Coro (vs Bengaluru, 30 November 2017)
Coro (vs Kerala, 9 December 2017)
First Hat trick: Dudu Omagbemi (vs Mumbai, 17 November 2015)
Fastest hat-trick: 7 minutes – Coro (vs Kerala Blasters FC, 9 December 2017) (also an ISL record)
Youngest goalscorer:
Muhammed Nemil – 19 years, 5 months and 26 days (vs Sudeva Delhi FC, 13 September 2021) in Durand Cup
Sahil Tavora – 21 years, 1 month and 12 days (vs Chennaiyin FC, 1 December 2016) in ISL
Youngest foreign goalscorer: Mark Sifneos – 21 years, 3 months and 4 days (vs  ATK, 28 February 2018)
Oldest goalscorer: Robert Pires – 41 years and 15 days (vs Delhi Dynamos, 13 November 2014) (also an ISL record)
Oldest Indian goalscorer: Lenny Rodrigues – 32 years, 6 months and 21 days (vs Kerala Blasters FC, 1 December 2019)
Fastest goal: 56 seconds – Jackichand Singh (vs ATK, 14 February 2019)

Most goals 
As of 3 October 2021
(Players with their name in bold currently plays for the club.)

<log> 

1 Other goals include: Durand Cup

Club Hat-tricks

Assists in ISL 
Most assists: 18 – Brandon Fernandes
First assist: Youness Bengelloun (vs Chennaiyin FC, 15 October 2014)
Most assists by a foreign player: 17 – Hugo Boumous (also an ISL record)
Most assists in a season: 10 – Hugo Boumous, during 2019–20 Indian Super League season (also an ISL record)
Most assists in a season by an Indian: 7 – Brandon Fernandes, during 2019-20 Indian Super League season (also a joint ISL record with Udanta Singh)

Most assists in ISL 
As of 9 March 2021 
(Players with their name in bold currently plays for the club.)

Clean sheets in ISL 
Most clean sheets: 10 –  Mohammad Nawaz
First clean sheet: Jan Seda (vs Mumbai City FC, 9 November 2014)
Most clean sheets in a season : 7 – Jan Seda, during 2014 Indian Super League season

Most clean sheets 
As of 3 October 2021
(Players with their name in bold currently plays for the club.)

1 Other clean sheets include: Durand Cup

Season Award Winners 

Golden Boot – The following players have won the Indian Super League Golden Boot award while playing for FC Goa:
2017-18 Indian Super League season: Ferran Corominas
2018-19 Indian Super League season: Ferran Corominas
2020-21 Indian Super League season: Igor Angulo
Golden Glove – The following player has won the Indian Super League Golden Glove award while playing for FC Goa:
2014 Indian Super League season: Jan Seda
Golden Ball – The following players have won the Indian Super League Golden Ball award while playing for FC Goa:
2018-19 Indian Super League season: Ferran Corominas
2019-20 Indian Super League season: Hugo Boumous
Winning Pass of the League – The following players have won the Winning Pass of the League award while playing for FC Goa:
2015 Indian Super League season: Leo Moura
2019-20 Indian Super League season: Hugo Boumous
2020-21 Indian Super League season: Alberto Noguera

Head coaches

References 

FC Goa
FC Goa
seasons